Group A of the 2006 Fed Cup Asia/Oceania Zone Group I was one of two pools in the Asia/Oceania Zone Group I of the 2006 Fed Cup. Three teams competed in a round robin competition, with the top team and the bottom two teams proceeding to their respective sections of the play-offs: the top teams played for advancement to the World Group II Play-offs, while the bottom teams faced potential relegation to Group II.

Australia vs. Uzbekistan

South Korea vs. Uzbekistan

Australia vs. South Korea

See also
Fed Cup structure

References

External links
 Fed Cup website

2006 Fed Cup Asia/Oceania Zone